The Vuelta del Paraguay is the most important road bicycle race in the State of Paraguay. The first edition of the race was held in 1993. It was organized as a 2.2 event on the UCI America Tour in 2010. The race has not been held since 2014.

Winners

External links
Official Website

UCI America Tour races
Cycle races in Paraguay
Recurring sporting events established in 1993
1993 establishments in Paraguay